Infinity is the debut album of German metal band End of Green. It was released by Nuclear Blast in 1996 and re-released by Silverdust Records in 2002.

Track listing 

 "Left My Way" – 6:03
 "Away" – 5:14
 "Seasons of Black" – 3:26
 "Infinity" – 6:31
 "Tomorrow Not Today" – 5:40
 "Sleep" – 4:40
 "You" – 5:26
 "Nice Day to Die" – 3:37
 "No More Pleasures" – 4:38

References 

1996 debut albums
Nuclear Blast albums
End of Green (band) albums